Daniel Wyder (born 15 February 1962) is a Swiss former racing cyclist. Professional from 1984 to 1992, he won the points race at the 1988 UCI Track Cycling World Championships and rode in five editions of the Giro d'Italia.

Major results

1980
 1st  Junior National Road Race Championships
1981
 1st Tour du Jura
1983
 1st  Overall Ronde de l'Isard
1986
 2nd Overall Circuit de la Sarthe
 6th Overall Tour of Belgium
1988
 1st  Points race, World Track Championships
 1st  Individual pursuit, National Track Championships
 2nd GP Lugano
1989
 7th Overall Tour de Suisse

Grand Tour general classification results timeline

References

External links

1962 births
Living people
People from Wädenswil
Swiss male cyclists
UCI Track Cycling World Champions (men)
Swiss track cyclists
Sportspeople from the canton of Zürich